Azarakhsh Mokri (Persian: آذرخش مکری), born 1968 in Tehran, is an Iranian psychiatrist. He is an assistant professor at Tehran University of Medical Sciences. He is also known for his studies of treatment of addiction and lectures for a wider audience on YouTube.

Background
Born in Tehran, Mokri spent his earliest years in Arlington, Texas. Later he returned to Iran, where he completed high school and entered medical school. In 1997, he graduated from the Tehran University of Medical Sciences with a doctorate in psychiatry.

Mokri then joined the faculty of Tehran University of Medical Sciences, Roozbeh Hospital. Among his achievements is the opening of a specialized department for addiction treatment and the training of psychiatric assistants and psychiatric students.

Footnote

References

1968 births
Living people
Iranian physicians
Iranian psychiatrists
Physicians from Tehran
Tehran University of Medical Sciences alumni
Academic staff of Tehran University of Medical Sciences